This is a list of tennis players who have represented the China Fed Cup team in an official Fed Cup match. China have taken part in the competition since 1981.

Players

References

External links
Chinese Tennis Association

Fed Cup
Lists of Billie Jean King Cup tennis players